The following is a list of presidents of the Landtag of Württemberg-Hohenzollern.

President of the Vervassunggebende Landesversammlung für Württemberg-Hohenzollern

Presidents of the Landtag

Sources
Landtag von Baden-Württemberg (HrSg.): Mdl, die Abgeordneten der Landtage in Baden Württemberg 1946-1978, Stuttgart 1978 

Political history of Germany
Lists of legislative speakers in Germany